The Duke of Mount Deer 2000 is a Hong Kong-Taiwanese television series adapted from Louis Cha's novel The Deer and the Cauldron. It was first broadcast in 2000 in Taiwan and followed by subsequent broadcasts in other Asian countries.

Plot
The story is set in the early Qing Dynasty. The protagonist is an uneducated street urchin called Wei Xiaobao, who was born and raised by his mother in a brothel in Yangzhou. Through a series of misadventures, Wei manages to make his way from Yangzhou to Beijing, the seat of the Qing government, where he accidentally bumbles into a fateful encounter with the young Kangxi Emperor. By hook or by crook, but also through a genuine concern and fierce loyalty towards Kangxi, Wei finds himself in the greatest of confidences and a complicated friendship with one of the most eminent monarchs in Chinese history.

The plot follows Wei on a rags-to-riches journey as he becomes embroiled in political and court intrigues, helping Kangxi overcome his enemies, and accomplishing amazing achievements. Along the way, Wei meets and successfully woos seven beautiful women, climbs his way up the social ladder from brothel boy to great lord and nobleman, acquiring titles such as 'Imperial Emissary and Plenipotentiary', 'Ambassador', 'General' and 'Admiral' — courtesy of Kangxi — as well as finding himself in positions completely at odds with the above: 'Green Wood Lodge Master' of the Heaven and Earth Society, and 'White Dragon Marshal' of the Mystic Dragon Cult.

In the end, however, Wei cannot reconcile his two separate lives — as an anti-Qing rebel and Kangxi's devoted courtier. He chose to offer up his own life — in return for Kangxi's munificence towards him and also as an honourable way out of the Heaven and Earth Society. Pained and aggrieved beyond words, Kangxi orders the execution of his one and only true friend. Afterwards, plagued by loss and guilt, Kangxi took a long walk along the Great Wall, asking Heaven for guidance — only to be happily surprised by the appearance of Wei, who did not die. After saving his mate's life once again, Wei bids Kangxi farewell, reaffirming their friendship which will, from that point onwards, remain only in their minds and memories.

Cast
 Dicky Cheung as Wei Xiaobao
 Patrick Tam as Kangxi Emperor
 Ruby Lin as Princess Jianning
 Annie Wu as Shuang'er
 Athena Chu as A'ke
 Teresa Mak as Fang Yi
 Monica Chan as Long'er
 Shu Qi as Xiao Jinyu
 Jess Zhang as Mu Jianping
 Wong Yat-fei as Duolong
 Bryan Leung as Hu Dedi
 Ekin Cheng as Chan Jinnan
 Ng Man-tat as Hai Dafu
 Chen Kuan-tai as Hong Antong
 Zheng Guo Lin as Zheng Keshuang
 Elvis Tsui as Oboi

VCD release
In 2002, Hong Kong's Television Broadcasts Limited (International) released The Duke of Mount Deer in a 24-disc VCD set with a total of 48 episodes, each about 35 minutes long. Viewers can choose to have the dialogue in Cantonese or Mandarin, along with subtitles in Traditional Chinese. The VCD set is no longer available now.

External links
  The Duke of Mount Deer official page on TVB website

2000 Taiwanese television series debuts
2001 Hong Kong television series debuts
TVB dramas
Taiwanese wuxia television series
Works based on The Deer and the Cauldron
Television series set in the Qing dynasty
Hong Kong wuxia television series
2000 Taiwanese television series endings
2001 Hong Kong television series endings
Television shows based on works by Jin Yong